Mark K. Keller (born January 14, 1954) is a former Republican member of the Pennsylvania House of Representatives for the 86th District. He was elected in 2004 and left office at the end of his eighth term in November 2020. He formerly sat on the House Agriculture & Rural Affairs, Game & Fisheries, Local Government, and Transportation Committees.

Career
Representative Keller advocated for rural and agricultural issues and considered protecting farmers and small businesses top legislative priorities.

Personal
Representative Keller graduated from West Perry High School. He attended the Missouri Auction School and is a member of the Pennsylvania Auctioneers Association. He also attended some classes at Penn State University.

He and his wife, Sally, reside in Landisburg and have one son, Bryan. He is a family man and loves his church. 
Rep. Keller and his family currently attend Mt. Zion Free Lutheran church in Landisburg, PA.

References

External links
Representative Keller's official web site
Pennsylvania House profile

1954 births
Living people
Republican Party members of the Pennsylvania House of Representatives
People from Perry County, Pennsylvania
People from Carlisle, Pennsylvania
Pennsylvania State University alumni
21st-century American politicians